Chlorolychnis is a genus of moths in the family Gelechiidae. It contains the species Chlorolychnis agnatella, which is found in Indonesia (Java) and Sri Lanka.

Adults are cinereous-brown, the forewings with many oblique parallel darker lines and with the marginal space speckled, without lines. The exterior border is convex and slightly oblique. The hindwings are cinereous.

References

Gelechiinae